Umesh Upadhyay is a veteran Indian television journalist and media executive. He is currently President & Director Media at Reliance Industries Limited., prior to which he was President News at Network 18.

Early life and career 
A career spanning over 25 years in media industry and academics, Umesh worked at Janmat TV (Channel Head), Zee News (Executive Producer and Editor, Output), SAB TV, Home TV (Executive Producer), Doordarshan (Correspondent), and Press Trust of India (Sub Editor). He started his career as a lecturer at Delhi University. He has been associated with All India Radio (AIR) as a political analyst and commentator. He is a noted member of the Editors Guild of India. Umesh held a senior position in the academic field as Director of Disha Education Society, Raipur. Apart from managing affairs of Disha Group of Institutions, he was designated as Pro VC of the upcoming Disha University. Umesh has been nominated by the Government of India to the Executive Council of the Indian Institute of Mass Communications, New Delhi. Umesh Upadhyay was a member of Jury of Narad Jayanti Awards in New Delhi. Umesh Upadhyay is an Executive Board member of National Institute of Open Schools, an autonomous institution under the Ministry of Human Resources Development, Government of India. NIOS is the largest open schooling system in the world. Umesh Upadhyay has been nominated to be a member of the search committee to select new Vice Chancellor for the Makhan Lal National University of Journalism and Mass Communication, Bhopal.

Education 
He is an alumnus of Jawaharlal Nehru University (JNU) and the University of Delhi. He has done his Master's and M.Phil at the School of International Studies, JNU. He has served as a member of the Academic Council of Delhi University. He has also been trained at the Film and Television Institute of India (FTII), Pune, Asian Institute for Broadcasting Development (Kula Lumpur), BSkyB (London), Thames Studios (UK) and CPC (Delhi).

Public speaker
Umesh Upadhyay is a TED speaker.
He is also a public speaker and an expert on media issues.
Umesh Upadhyay is a regular commentator on current national/international issues.

Awards and memberships
Umesh has been awarded with prestigious Ganesh Shankar Vidyarthi Award for lifetime contribution in the field of Journalism and media.
He is a member of the Management Committee and Executive Council of Makhanlal Chaturvedi National University for Mass Communication 
and Journalism, Bhopal.

Umesh is a member of the Advisory Council of National Institute of Mass Communication and Journalism, Ahmedabad.
He is a member of the IIMC Society.
Umesh is member of the Executive Council of the Indian Institute of Mass Communication, New Delhi.
Umesh Upadhyay is a member of the Executive Board of National Open School Society of India (NOS).

References

External links
 

Indian television executives
Living people
Indian chief executives
Indian male television journalists
Indian broadcast news analysts
Indian television presenters
1960 births